The 2019 Ladies Open Lugano (also known as the 2019 Samsung Open presented by Cornèr for sponsorship reasons) was a women's tennis tournament played on clay courts at TC Lido Lugano. It was the third edition of the tournament and part of the International category of the 2019 WTA Tour. It took place between 8 April through 14 April 2019.

Points and prize money

Point distribution

Prize money

Singles main draw entrants

Seeds

 1 Rankings are as of 1 April 2019.

Other entrants
The following players received wildcards into the main draw:
 Ylena In-Albon
 Svetlana Kuznetsova
 Jil Teichmann

The following players received entry from the qualifying draw:
 Magdalena Fręch 
 Giulia Gatto-Monticone
 Réka Luca Jani
 Antonia Lottner
 Clara Tauson
 Katarina Zavatska

Withdrawals
 Dominika Cibulková → replaced by  Kristýna Plíšková
 Alizé Cornet → replaced by  Viktorija Golubic
 Kirsten Flipkens → replaced by  Timea Bacsinszky
 Anna-Lena Friedsam → replaced by  Tamara Korpatsch
 Camila Giorgi → replaced by  Tereza Smitková
 Anett Kontaveit → replaced by  Mandy Minella
 Kristina Mladenovic → replaced by  Arantxa Rus
 Andrea Petkovic → replaced by  Sorana Cîrstea
 Yulia Putintseva → replaced by  Fiona Ferro
 Markéta Vondroušová → replaced by  Mona Barthel

Doubles main draw entrants

Seeds

1 Rankings are as of 1 April 2019.

Other entrants
The following pairs received wildcards into the main draw:
  Timea Bacsinszky /  Ylena In-Albon
  Leonie Küng /  Clara Tauson

Withdrawals
 Viktorija Golubic (left leg injury)

Champions

Singles 

  Polona Hercog def.  Iga Świątek 6–3, 3–6, 6–3

Doubles 

  Sorana Cîrstea /  Andreea Mitu def.  Veronika Kudermetova /  Galina Voskoboeva, 1–6, 6–2, [10–8]

References

External links 
 

Ladies Open Lugano
Ladies Open Lugano
Ladies Open Lugano
Ladies Open Lugano
2019 in Swiss tennis